William Bryant (26 November 1913 – 25 December 1975) was an English footballer.

Bryant started his career with Wolverhampton Wanderers after joining from his local side Cockfield, based in County Durham. He made his league debut for Wolves on 3 December 1932 in a 5–2 win over Blackburn Rovers, the first of a run of four starts. After one further appearance the following season, he left to join Wrexham.

He left Wrexham for Manchester United, and scored on his debut for them in a Second Division match against Blackpool on 3 November 1934. He went on to make 157 appearances for United, scoring 42 goals.

Career statistics

References

1913 births
1975 deaths
People from Shildon
Footballers from County Durham
English footballers
Wolverhampton Wanderers F.C. players
Wrexham A.F.C. players
Manchester United F.C. players
Chester City F.C. wartime guest players
Bradford City A.F.C. players
Altrincham F.C. players
Stalybridge Celtic F.C. players
English Football League players
Association football outside forwards